Lesser Slave Lake—known traditionally as "Beaver Lake" (ᐊᒥᐢᐠ ᓵᑲᐦᐃᑲᐣ amisk sâkâhikan in the Plains Cree language, and T’saat’ine migeh in Dene Zhatıé) or "Beaver people were over there, living there" (ᐊᔭᐦᒋᔨᓂᐤ ᓵᑲᐦᐃᑲᐣ ayahciyiniw sâkahikan and T’saatine nda ghe’in’deh)—is located in central Alberta, Canada, northwest of Edmonton. It drains eastwards into the Athabasca River by way of the Lesser Slave River.

The town of Slave Lake is located at the eastern tip of the lake, around the outflow of Lesser Slave River.

Conservation and development 

Due to its location on a major fly-way for migrating birds, Lesser Slave Lake is popular with birders. The nearby Lesser Slave Lake Provincial Park has lakeside camping facilities located along sand beaches, with some rocky beaches as well. Fishing is popular and legal. The entire north shore of the lake is protected, other reserves being Hilliard's Bay Provincial Park, Lesser Slave Lake Wildland and Grouard Trail Park Reserve.

Highway 2 and the Canadian National Railway follow the southern shore of the lake, and the Bicentennial Highway has its southernmost point at eastern end of the lake.

A number of Indian reserves are established at the shores of the lake:
Kapawe'no First Nations Lands 150, 230 and 231 of the Kapawe'no First Nation, 
Sucker Creek 150a of the Sucker Creek Cree First Nation
Drift Pile River 150 of the Driftpile First Nation
Swan River 150e of the Swan River First Nation 
Sawridge 150g and h Sawridge Band

Accidents 
February 14, 1968
On February 14, 1968, a Cessna 182H CF-WUK plane crashed into the lake due to ice forming on the wings and causing the pilot to lose control. The pilot was a Graham James Cox, a former 501 Squadron Commander during the Second World War. Both he and his two passengers died in the accident. The passengers were William Henry Lucus and Kenneth McIntosh McMillan.

May 20, 2011
On May 20, 2011, a Bell 212 helicopter crashed into the lake while fighting the 2011 Slave Lake fire.  The pilot, 54-year-old Jean-Luc Deba of Montreal, died. On the one-year anniversary, a park at Canyon Creek was named in Deba's honor.

References

External links 
 Lesser Slave Lake Regional Tourism

Big Lakes County
Hudson's Bay Company trading posts
Lakes of Alberta
Municipal District of Lesser Slave River No. 124